The Naked Truth is the fourth studio album by American rapper Lil' Kim, released on September 27, 2005. The album was released the same week she started her year-long prison sentence for perjury and it was her last studio album released by Atlantic Records before deciding to part ways in 2008. Two official singles were released from the album: "Lighters Up" as the lead single, released in September 2005, and "Whoa", as the second and final single, in February 2006. The Naked Truth remains the only album by a female rapper to be rated five mics by The Source. The album has sold over 400,000 copies in the United States.

Singles
The first single taken from the album was "Lighters Up". It was released on September 13, 2005, and was a moderate success, peaking at number 31 on the Billboard Hot 100. The second, and final, single from the album was "Whoa". Released on February 7, 2006, it was less successful than its predecessor and failed to make the Hot 100. It did manage to chart in the UK, peaking at number 43.

Promotional singles
The first promo single taken from the album was "Shut Up Bitch". For the release the title was censored to "Shut Up". Released to radio on July 12, 2005, the song served as a promotional single for the album and peaked at number 73 on the Billboard Hot R&B/Hip-Hop Songs chart. It can be heard at the start of the "Lighters Up" music video. The second promo single was "Spell Check". It was released to US radio as a promo single for the album in December 2005, alongside "Whoa". The song was promoted in the music video for "Whoa" with Kim rapping the first verse and chorus near the end.

Critical reception

The album received generally positive reviews and was given a score of 66 out of 100 by Metacritic, with 5 star ratings from The Source (in which she became the first and only female rapper to ever receive 5 mics), Vibe Magazine, and The Village Voice, and less than favorable reviews from The New York Times and AllMusic. Blender gave the album four stars, calling it her "strongest work since her pheromone-thick 1996 debut". While the album did receive several 5 star ratings, Pitchfork journalist Jess Harvell, who gave the album a positive 7.8 rating, stated, "The Naked Truth may be better than 80% of the other rap albums to be released in 2005, but that doesn't make it another Ready to Die."

Commercial performance
The Naked Truth debuted at number six on the Billboard 200 and at number three on the Top R&B/Hip-Hop Albums chart, selling 109,000 copies in its first week. It sold 394,000 copies in the US and 500,000 worldwide.

Track listing

Sample credts
"Spell Check" contains interpolations of "Mo Money Mo Problems" by Notorious B.I.G.
"All Good" contains samples from "Juicy" by Notorious B.I.G..
"I Know You See Me" contains samples from "Whatcha See Is Whatcha Get" by The Dramatics.
"Durty" contains samples from "Wild Bird" by Martha Veléz and elements from "Phunk U Symphony" by Millie Jackson.
"Kitty Box" contains elements from "Love Buzz" by Shocking Blue.

Personnel

 Kimberly "Lil' Kim" Jones – executive producer
 Christopher "The Notorious B.I.G." Wallace – executive producer
 Craig Kallman – executive producer
 Hillary Weston – co-executive producer, manager
 Jean Nelson – co-executive producer, A&R
 Gee Roberson – co-executive producer, A&R
 Dre Weston – A&R
 Kyambo "HipHop" Joshua – A&R
 Lanre Gaba – A&R administrator
 Jamel Jackson – product manager
 Veronica Alvericci – product manager
 Dan the Man for Dan Man Productions – engineer
 Chris Gehringer – mastering
 Will Quinell – assistant mastering engineer
 L. Londell McMillian – legal affairs
 Berdon LLP – business affairs
 Deborah Mannis-Gardiner – sample clearances
 Robert D'Este – photography (cover and page 12)
 Roger Erickson – photography (outside inlay and pages 2–11)
 Patty Wilson – styling
 Kithe Brewster – styling
 Will Robinson – hair
 JJ – makeup
 Andrew Zach – art producer
 Ellen To – art direction, design
 Alex Kirzhner – design

Charts

Weekly charts

Year-end charts

References

2005 albums
Albums produced by Fredwreck
Albums produced by J. R. Rotem
Albums produced by Mr. Porter
Albums produced by Scott Storch
Atlantic Records albums
Lil' Kim albums
International Rock Star Records albums